Nova Scotia Gaelic Mod is an annual folk festival, held every August in the Cape Breton Island region of Nova Scotia, Canada. It features many traditional Scottish games, dances, costumes, and food specialties. The whole of eastern Nova Scotia turns up for Sword Dances, pipe bands, athletic  events, and general celebration of the region's strong ties to Scotland and Scottish culture.

Ferries are available from Bar Harbor, Maine to Halifax, Nova Scotia regularly during the summer months.

References

External links 
 
 
 

Canadian Gaelic
Music festivals in Nova Scotia
Folk festivals in Canada
Canadian Celtic music
Scottish-Canadian culture
Cape Breton Island